Daniil Vladimirovich Parkman (born 17 April 1999) is a Russian-born pair skater who competes for Georgia. With his skating partner, Anastasiia Metelkina, he is the 2022 Grand Prix of Espoo bronze medalist and 2021 CS Golden Spin of Zagreb silver medalist.

Metelkina/Parkman are the first Georgian pairs team to compete at a World Championships, doing so in 2021. In January 2023, the couple broke up and will not perform at the European Championship in Finnish Espoo.

Parkman previously intended to represent Belarus with Viktoria Yatsenko, but the pair never competed either domestically or internationally. Earlier in his career, he competed for Russia in men's singles and in pairs with Elena Pavlova and Daria Lobova.

Programs

With Metelkina

Competitive highlights

With Metelkina for Georgia

With Pavlova for Russia

Men's singles for Russia

Detailed results 
ISU Personal Best highlighted in bold.

With Metelkina

References

External links 
 
 

1999 births
Living people
Russian male pair skaters
Belarusian male pair skaters
Male pair skaters from Georgia (country)
Figure skaters from Saint Petersburg